The 2009 Mid-American Conference football season is an NCAA football season that was played from September 3, 2009, to January 7, 2010.  The Mid-American Conference consists of twelve full-time members, with Temple University holding an affiliate membership for football.

Previous season 
Ball State entered the 2008 MAC Championship Game undefeated and as the champion of the West Division.  This was also their first ever appearance in the game.  Ranked #12 in the country, they faced East Division champion Buffalo in the annual contest held at Ford Field.  That was Buffalo's first appearance as well.  The Bulls upset Ball State and took the MAC Championship, giving Ball State their first loss of the season.

After the championship game ended, four MAC football head coaches either resigned or were fired from their teams.  This began with Ball State's coach Brady Hoke, who resigned to pursue a head coaching job at San Diego State University.  He was replaced by Stan Parrish for the 2009 season.  Parrish was promoted internally after serving as Ball State's assistant football coach for four seasons.  The only other head coaching change in the West Division was in Eastern Michigan where Jeff Genyk, head coach for the past five years, was fired after a combined 15–42 record.  He was replaced by Ron English, who served as an assistant coach at the University of Michigan for five years as well as the University of Louisville during the 2008 season.

In the East Division, two schools also saw head coaching changes.  Miami University's head coach Shane Montgomery resigned after a 2–10 record in the 2008 season.  His best season at Miami was in 2005 when he led the team to a 7–4 overall record and a tie for the MAC East title.  However, in that season Akron won the tiebreaker to play in the MAC Championship Game against West champion Northern Illinois.  Montgomery was replaced by Mike Haywood who served four years as Notre Dame University's offensive coordinator.  At Bowling Green, six-year head coach Gregg Brandon was fired.  However, Brandon did find another job in college football when he was named the new University of Virginia offensive coordinator.  He was replaced at Bowling Green by Dave Clawson, who was the offensive coordinator and quarterbacks coach at the University of Tennessee.

Preseason

Preseason poll 
The 2009 MAC Preseason Poll was announced at the Football Media Preview in Detroit on July 31.  In the East Division, Buffalo was selected to repeat as divisional champions, and Central Michigan selected to top the West.  Also, Central Michigan received 18 votes to win the MAC Championship Game.

West Division
 Central Michigan – 154 points
 Western Michigan – 126 points
 Northern Illinois – 103 points
 Toledo – 71 points
 Ball State – 58 points
 Eastern Michigan – 34 points

East Division
 Buffalo – 155 points
 Temple – 144 points
 Akron – 128 points
 Ohio – 116 points
 Bowling Green – 101 points
 Kent State – 51 points
 Miami – 33 points

MAC Championship
 Central Michigan – 18 votes
 Western Michigan – 4 votes
 Buffalo – 2 votes
 Temple – 2 votes

Award watch lists

Regular season

Week one 
Opening weekend for the Mid-American Conference consisted of six home games and six away games.  Also, Miami faced Kentucky in a battle contested at Paul Brown Stadium in Cincinnati, Ohio.  Bowling Green, Kent State, and Buffalo were the only teams to win the opening weekend.  Buffalo was also the only team to win an away game as their season opener.

Week two

Week three

Week four

Week five

Week six

Week seven

Week eight

Week nine

Week ten

Homecoming games

Players of the Week

East Division

West Division

Bowl games

References